Dragan 'Jokso' Joksović (born 11 August 1956 in Pljevlja, PR Montenegro, FPR Yugoslavia; died 4 February 1998 in Stockholm, Sweden), was a Swedish-Montenegrin mobster. The police believed that Joksović could be called the Stockholm "gangster king", being largely suspected in controlling cigarette smuggling into Sweden and Denmark. Brought to court many times, he wasn't able to be convicted with any offense other than minor drug offenses, assault and abuse of judicial procedure. He was murdered at the Solvalla Horse Racing Track in Stockholm on 4 February 1998 by Finnish hitman Janne Raninen. His nose was broken and he was shot to death at three meters' distance. Janne surrendered himself to two security guards working in the restaurant where the shooting took place. Although Raninen claims to have shot four shots, two staff at the betting booth Joksović was murdered in front, were also hit by bullets from the shooting, suggesting more shots were fired. Both staff members were taken to hospital, one had been penetrated in the arm by a bullet and the other had been grazed by a bullet. A bystander in the queue to the betting booth was also hit in the shoulder by a bullet.

Joksović's family moved to Titograd shortly after his birth. He grew up in Titograd together with Lazo Delević, with whom he also earned a reputation as a street fighter and muscleman. He came to Sweden in 1979 from the Former Yugoslavia, after beating a military officer in order to avoid prosecution, where he befriended Željko "Arkan" Ražnatović, another Serbian gangster and killer, who later became his godbrother.

He owned several top restaurants in Stockholm and several race horses, going to the race track at least a couple of times a month. Jokso was good friends with associate mobster Ratko Đokić, and acted as mentor to current boss Milan Ševo.

Joksović's assassin shot him in the head twice at close range, then fired two more shots to the body. After his death, Arkan allegedly cried for the first time in his life. Joksović's killer was sentenced on 26 October 2006 by the Helsinki Court of Appeal to life in prison. The murder of Dragan Joksović was the beginning of a Serbian gang war in Sweden. The hit on Jokso was made by one of Jokso's soldiers Dragan "Kova" Kovač over money issues. Five months later, on 9 July 1998, Kova was murdered with a submachine gun outside a Stockholm restaurant in broad daylight.

Joksović was physically imposing, and is remembered as one of the strongest of Serbian gangsters. His most notable fight was with Đorđe Božović in the garden of Ratko Đokić's house in Zlatica neighbourhood of Podgorica. Although he backed down first, Giška later recounted that he was "the toughest man he ever fought".

See also

 Serbian Brotherhood
 Serbian Mafia
 Easy Money (novel)

References

1956 births
1998 deaths
Assassinated Serbian people
Deaths by firearm in Sweden
People murdered in Sweden
Serbian emigrants to Sweden
Serbian gangsters
People from Pljevlja
Serbs of Montenegro